Elliott Leslie Ward (born 19 January 1985) is a retired English professional footballer who played as a defender. He played in the Premier League for West Ham United and Norwich City.

Playing career

West Ham United
Ward was born in Harrow, Greater London, and came through the youth system of West Ham United, making his debut for the Under-17 side before joining the first team in August 2003. In 2004, Ward went out for two loan spells, at Peterborough United and Bristol Rovers in July and December 2004 respectively.

Ward made an impact on the West Ham first team during the second half of the 2004–05 season, while the club were in the Football League Championship. Primarily due to injuries to more established defenders such as Christian Dailly and Malky Mackay, he found himself with the opportunity of partnering Anton Ferdinand in the centre of defence.

When Ward was brought into the first team, for the 1–3 loss against Reading on 12 March 2005, the club were lying outside the playoff places and looked unlikely to make it back to the Premiership. The pairing of Ward and Ferdinand enabled the team to remain unbeaten for the rest of the season. This unbeaten run included the three play-off games, thus ensuring their return to the Premiership for the following season.

At the beginning of the 2005–06 season, to prepare for the upcoming Premiership campaign, West Ham signed a number of players, including central defenders Danny Gabbidon and James Collins from Cardiff City. Gabbidon became the preferred choice to partner Ferdinand, and this resulted in chances being few and far between for Ward. He played two League Cup games, but made only one substitute Premiership appearance (against Bolton Wanderers on 27 August 2005) before being loaned out to Plymouth Argyle in November. The month-by-month loan deal lasted three months, and after playing 16 games and scoring once against Wolves, Ward returned to The Hammers in February 2006 playing three further games towards the end of the 2005–06 season.

Coventry City
Ward left West Ham in the summer of 2006, joining Coventry City for £1 million. Manager Micky Adams said of him: "In Elliott we have a young, talented and confident defender who I'm sure will bring a real presence to our back line. He is just the sort of player we are looking for to help the club progress."

Ward made his debut for Coventry on 6 August 2006 in a 2–1 home win against Sunderland with his first goal coming on 12 September 2006 in a 2–1 away defeat to Ipswich Town. The next three seasons saw him play 39, 37 and 32 league games for Coventry scoring 14 league goals but by season 2009–10 he was reduced to only eight games for the season. Having fallen down the pecking order at Coventry, in February 2010 he joined Doncaster Rovers on a one-month emergency loan after Rovers suffered injuries to several first team defenders. He made an instant impact at Doncaster, scoring an overhead kick goal on his debut against Sheffield Wednesday at Hillsborough. He played only six league games for Doncaster before being signed by Preston North End manager Darren Ferguson, on loan until the end of the season, in March 2010. He made only four league appearances for Preston before returning to Coventry City.

Norwich City
On 26 May 2010, Ward signed a two-year deal with Norwich City on a free transfer. His Norwich debut came on 6 August in the opening game of the 2010–11 season, a 2–3 home defeat to Watford. Ward picked up an injury in the 2–1 away win over Coventry City on 18 December, sidelining him until the end of January. He made his return to the team in the 2–1 win over Millwall on 1 February 2011, scoring his first goal for the club to equalise.

Ward played 39 of a possible 46 league games in Norwich City's side which won promotion to the Premier League in 2010–11 season but in July 2011, during a pre-season tour of Germany, Ward picked up a knee injury which kept him out of action until January 2012.

In October 2012 Ward joined Nottingham Forest on loan until 29 December 2012, with a view to a permanent transfer. Ward returned to Norwich at the end of his loan spell and was named as a substitute for their FA Cup game away at Peterborough United. However, in January 2013, after just over a week with Norwich, he returned on loan with Nottingham Forest. His first Forest goal came in his first game of his second loan spell, on 12 January 2013. His headed goal in the 83rd minute from a Radosław Majewski cross saw Forest 2–1 winners against Peterborough United giving manager Alex McLeish his first win as Forest manager.

AFC Bournemouth

On 18 June 2013 Ward signed an initial one-year deal with AFC Bournemouth following their promotion to the Championship. He made two league appearances during Bournemouth's 2014–15 season after which they were promoted to the Premier League. His contract with Bournemouth was cancelled in January 2016 by mutual consent.

Huddersfield Town (loan)
On 9 September 2015, Ward signed on loan for Championship club Huddersfield Town for an initial period of a month. He made his Town début in the 2–0 loss against Cardiff City on 12 September. He played five games, before returning to Bournemouth, due to a knee injury. Following recovery from the injury, Ward rejoined the Terriers on 7 December for a second loan spell until 28 December. However, he returned to the South Coast on the conclusion of this loan without being included in a match-day squad in his second spell.

Blackburn Rovers
On 20 January 2016, Ward signed with Blackburn Rovers on a two and a half year deal. Ward appeared seven times for Blackburn in his first season, scoring once.

At the very end of the 2018 January transfer window, Ward was loaned out to Milton Keynes Dons, before being released by Blackburn at the end of the 2017–18 season.

Notts County
On 3 September 2018, Ward joined Notts County. The length of contract was not disclosed.

He was released by Notts County at the end of the 2018–19 season.

Cambridge United
In September 2019, Ward joined Cambridge United on a contract lasting until January 2020.

Chelmsford City
On 17 February 2020, Ward signed for Chelmsford City, making his debut on the same evening in a 3–1 win against Tonbridge Angels.

On 21 June 2021, Chelmsford announced Ward's retirement from football.

Coaching career
Following his retirement, Ward remained at Chelmsford as their academy assistant manager. In March 2022, Ward returned to West Ham as an under-14's coach.

Personal life
He is the brother of Scott Ward and Hemel Hempstead Town defender Darren Ward, who turned down the opportunity of joining West Ham and the Premiership, at the start of the 2005–06 season, instead opting for Championship side Crystal Palace, claiming he did not want to keep his brother out of the team.

Career statistics

Honours
West Ham United
Football League Championship play-offs: 2005

References

External links

Elliott Ward  at Soccerbase

1985 births
Living people
Footballers from Harrow, London
English footballers
Association football central defenders
West Ham United F.C. players
Peterborough United F.C. players
Bristol Rovers F.C. players
Plymouth Argyle F.C. players
Coventry City F.C. players
Doncaster Rovers F.C. players
Preston North End F.C. players
Norwich City F.C. players
Nottingham Forest F.C. players
AFC Bournemouth players
Huddersfield Town A.F.C. players
Blackburn Rovers F.C. players
Milton Keynes Dons F.C. players
Notts County F.C. players
Cambridge United F.C. players
Chelmsford City F.C. players
English Football League players
Premier League players
Chelmsford City F.C. non-playing staff
Association football coaches
West Ham United F.C. non-playing staff